There are 26 constituencies in Switzerland – one for each of the 26 cantons of Switzerland – for the election of the National Council and the Council of States.

The National Council consists of 200 members. National Council seats are apportioned to the cantons based on their respective population size (which includes children and resident foreigners who do not have the right to vote). As of the 2019 federal election, there are twenty multi-member constituencies with Zürich having the most number of National Council seats at 35. There are six constituencies that only have one National council seat: Appenzell Ausserrhoden, Appenzell Innerrhoden, Glarus, Nidwalden, Obwalden and Uri. Multi-member constituencies elect their National Council members by open list proportional representation, while single-seat constituencies elect theirs by first-past-the-post voting.

The Council of States consists of 46 members. There are 20 two-seat constituencies representing 20 "full" cantons and six one-seat constituencies representing six "half" cantons. In 24 constituencies, Council of States members are elected using a majority system. Proportional representation is used to elect Council of States members in Jura and Neuchâtel.

List of constituencies

Defunct constituencies 
From 1848 until 1919, members of the National Council was voted using a majority system. The number of members of the National Council changed after a number of years on the results of a census. During this period, a National Council member represented 20,000 people. 

Constituencies during these period were of various sizes. Smaller cantons were usually represented in one constituency while larger cantons were divided into several constituencies. There were single-member constituencies, as well as multi-member constituencies with the largest being the constituencies of Aargau from 1848 until 1851 and Zürich-Southwest from 1902 until 1911 which both had nine seats. These constituencies were officially referred to by an assigned number, but was also unofficially referred to by their names that were based on the name of the canton or a geographical area within a canton.

From 1848 to 1851, constituencies were designated by the cantonal governments. A federal election law designated the constituencies starting from 1851 until the introduction of the proportional representation system in 1919.

List of constituencies prior to 1919

List of defunct constituencies 
The listed constituencies are referred to by their unofficial names. They are officially referred to by a designated number which changes after a number of years.

 Aargau-Central
 Aargau-North
 Aargau-Southeast
 Aargau-Southwest
 Bern-Emmental
 Bern-Jura
 Bern-Mittelland
 Bern-North Jura
 Bern-Oberaargau
 Bern-Oberland
 Bern-Seeland
 Bern-South Jura
 Central Valais
 Fribourg-Central
 Fribourg-North
 Fribourg-South
 Grisons-Central
 Grisons-East
 Grisons-North
 Grisons-West
 Lower Valais
 Lucerne-Central
 Lucerne-East
 Lucerne-North
 Lucerne-Northeast
 Lucerne-Northwest
 Lucerne-South
 Lucerne-Southwest
 Lucerne-West
 Schwyz-North
 Schwyz-South
 St. Gallen-Central
 St. Gallen-Northwest
 St. Gallen-Northeast
 St. Gallen-South
 St. Gallen-Stadt
 St. Gallen-West
 Thurgau 1
 Thurgau 2
 Thurgau 3
 Thurgau 4
 Ticino-North
 Ticino-South
 Upper Valais
 Upper Valais-North
 Upper Valais-South
 Vaud-East
 Vaud-North
 Vaud-West
 Zürich-East
 Zürich-North
 Zürich-South
 Zürich-Southwest
 Zürich-West

References 

Switzerland
Elections in Switzerland
Politics of Switzerland
Switzerland politics-related lists